Derek Stanford FRSL (11 October 1918 – 19 December 2008) was a British writer, known as a biographer, essayist and poet.

Educated at Upper Latymer School, Hammersmith, London, he was a conscientious objector during World War II, serving in the Non-Combatant Corps. He edited Resistance, a poetry magazine of just one issue, with David West in 1946.

For a period in the early 1950s he worked with Muriel Spark on several books, and was a supporter of hers (together with the poetic eccentric Hugo Manning, a long-term friend), in the Poetry Society. Stanford described Spark's ousting in Inside the Forties.

Spark convinced him of the talent of Dylan Thomas, and Stanford wrote an early book on Thomas shortly after his death. He is associated with the character Hector Bartlett in Muriel Spark's A Far Cry from Kensington (1988).
 
Stanford died in 2008, aged 90, in Brighton. His widow is the poet Julie Whitby.

Works

A Romantic Miscellany (1946) editor with John Bayliss
The Freedom of Poetry: Studies in Contemporary Verse (1947)
Music for Statues (1948)
Tribute to Wordsworth: A Miscellany of Opinion for the Centenary of the Poet's Death (1950) editor with Muriel Spark
Christopher Fry: An Appreciation (1951)
Christopher Fry Album (1952
Emily Brontë: her life and work (1953) with Muriel Spark
My Best Mary (letters of Mary Wollstonecraft Shelley) (1953) editor with Muriel Spark
Dylan Thomas: a literary study (1954)
 Letters of John Henry Newman (1957) editor with Muriel Spark
 Fenelon's Letters to Men and Women (1957) editor
Anne Brontë: Her Life And Work (1959) with Ada Harrison
John Betjeman - A Study (1961)
Muriel Spark: a Biographical and Critical Study (1963)
Concealment and Revelation in T. S. Eliot (1965)
 Poets of the 'Nineties. A Biographical Anthology (1965)
 Prose of the Century (1966)
 The Body Of Love: An Anthology of Erotic Verse from Chaucer to Lawrence (1966) editor
Aubrey Beardsley's Erotic Universe (1967)
Short Stories of the 'Nineties: A Biographical Anthology (1968) editor
Movements in English poetry, 1900-1958 (1969)
Stephen Spender, Louis MacNeice, Cecil Day-Lewis: a critical essay (1969)
Critics of the 'Nineties (1970)
Writing of the 'Nineties: From Wilde to Beerbohm (1971)
Pre-Raphaelite Writing (1973) editor
Three Poets of the Rhymers Club: Ernest Dowson, Lionel Johnson, John Davidson (1974)
Inside the Forties: literary memoirs, 1937-1957 (1977)
The Memorare Sequence (1997)
The Weather Within (1978)
The Traveller Hears the Strange Machine: Selected Poems 1946-1979 (1980)
The Vision and Death of Aubrey Beardsley (1985)

Notes

External links
Obituary by James Fergusson in The Independent
Stuart A. Rose Manuscript, Archives, and Rare Book Library, Emory University: Derek Stanford collection, 1938-1979

1918 births
2008 deaths
British conscientious objectors
Personnel of the Non-Combatant Corps
British biographers
Fellows of the Royal Society of Literature
English male poets
20th-century English poets
20th-century biographers
20th-century English male writers
Male biographers
Military personnel from London
People from Hammersmith